Tomás Balduíno, O.P. (born Paulo Balduino de Sousa Décio,<ref>[http://g1.globo.com/goias/noticia/2014/05/corpo-de-dom-tomas-balduino-e-levado-para-cidade-de-goias.html Corpo de dom Tomás Balduino é levado para a cidade de Goiás]</ref> December 31, 1922 – May 2, 2014) was a diocesan bishop of the Catholic Church in Brazil.

 Biography 
Tomás Balduíno was born in Posse, Goiás, and was ordained a priest on July 4, 1948, from the religious order of the Order of Friars Preachers, known as the Dominican Order.  Balduíno was appointed Coadjutor Prelate of the Roman Catholic Diocese of Santíssima Conceição do Araguaia on August 15, 1967, as well as titular bishop of Vicus Pacati.

Balduíno was appointed bishop of Roman Catholic Diocese of Goiás on November 10, 1967, and was ordained bishop on November 26, 1967.

He was the founder, in 1975, and first president of the Comissão Patroral da Terra''.

Balduíno retired as bishop on December 2, 1998.

Balduíno has been referred to as one of the most important promoters of the Liberation theology. In March 2009, he participated in ceremonies in Rome commemorating the 29th anniversary of the murder of Mgr. Óscar Romero.

References

1922 births
2014 deaths
20th-century Roman Catholic bishops in Brazil
21st-century Roman Catholic bishops in Brazil
Brazilian Christian socialists
Brazilian Dominicans
People from Goiás
Dominican bishops
Liberation theologians
Roman Catholic bishops of Goiás
Roman Catholic bishops of Marabá